Luke McGrath (born 3 February 1993) is an Irish rugby union player for Leinster Rugby. His preferred position is scrum-half. He made his senior debut in May 2012 against the Newport Gwent Dragons and represented Ireland at underage grades. In May 2014 it was announced that he had signed a contract to join the senior squad following promotion from the academy.

International career
Though born in Canada, McGrath was raised in Ireland and represents Ireland internationally.

Honours
Leinster
European Rugby Champions Cup (1): 2018
Pro14 (6): 2013, 2014, 2018, 2019, 2020, 2021

Individual
Leinster Player of the year (1): 2016–17

References

External links
Leinster Profile
Ireland Profile
Pro14 Profile

1993 births
Living people
Sportspeople from Hamilton, Ontario
People educated at St Michael's College, Dublin
Irish rugby union players
Ireland international rugby union players
Canadian rugby union players
Canadian people of Irish descent
University College Dublin R.F.C. players
Leinster Rugby players
Rugby union scrum-halves